R.A.A.F. Eagles Over New Guinea is a 1943 Australian newsreel from Cinesound Productions focusing on the role of the RAAF during the New Guinea Campaign in World War II. It includes combat footage taken by Damien Parer.

A copy of the newsreel has survived but not with sound.

References

External links
R.A.A.F. Eagles Over New Guinea at Oz Movies
Complete copy of film although without sound at YouTube
25 minutes of original Damien Parer footage used in the documentary at Australian War Memorial

Australian World War II propaganda films
1943 films
Australian aviation films
Australian black-and-white films
Australian short documentary films
1943 documentary films
1940s short documentary films
1940s English-language films